Josh Guenter  (born April 22, 1994) is a Canadian politician and member of the Legislative Assembly of Manitoba, representing the electoral division of Borderland. He was elected in the 2019 Manitoba general election as a member of the Progressive Conservative Party of Manitoba.

Early life
Guenter was born in Altona, Manitoba, and grew up in the nearby community of Gnadenthal. After graduating from high school, he studied briefly at the University of Manitoba and University of Ottawa.

Political career
He worked on Parliament Hill for two years while living in Ottawa, Ontario, and more recently for Candice Bergen and Cameron Friesen. Guenter won the Manitoba PC Party nomination for Borderland on April 11, 2019. The riding was created by the 2018 provincial redistribution out of parts of Emerson and Morden-Winkler.

On September 10, 2019, Guenter became the youngest ever Progressive Conservative to be elected to the Manitoba Legislative Assembly at the age of 25. He served as the Legislative Assistant to the Minister of Health and Seniors Care, and as a member of the provincial Treasury Board. He has served on the Economic Growth and Development Committee of Cabinet, as well as the Public Sector Compensation Committee of Cabinet.

Personal life
Guenter was a long-haul truck driver from the Altona, Manitoba area. He is married with two children.

Election Results

References

1994 births
21st-century Canadian politicians
Living people
People from Pembina Valley Region, Manitoba
Progressive Conservative Party of Manitoba MLAs